Jordan Seabright (born 1 May 1994) is an English semi-professional footballer who plays as a goalkeeper.

Career
Born in Poole, Dorset, Seabright was with Poole Town and Bournemouth before signing a one-year contract with Dagenham in August 2012. He made his Dagenham début on 3 November 2012 in the FA Cup in a 4–0 away defeat to his old club Bournemouth, coming on as a second-half substitute for regular goalkeeper, Chris Lewington.

He later made his league début in March, once again coming on for regular goalkeeper Chris Lewington away at Fleetwood Town. This was followed up two weeks later by his full league début away at Exeter City, where Dagenham clinched 1–0 win and Seabright secured his first clean sheet in professional football. Seabright signed for newly relegated Conference Premier team Torquay United on a one-year contract on 2 July 2014. Seabright made his first début for Torquay United against Aldershot in the FA Cup 4th round qualifying. After a good performance Seabright was able to maintain his spot for the following game at Kidderminster Harriers. Seabright managed to keep his second clean sheet of his career against Welling United on 28 December 2014 since then he kept another clean sheet against Bromley in the FA Trophy.

In February 2015, Seabright announced his retirement from football, deciding to begin a new career as a car salesman. However, in November 2015, Seabright joined Gosport Borough when first choice 'keeper Nathan Ashmore was injured.

Career statistics

References

External links

Poole Stats at Poole Town

1994 births
Living people
Sportspeople from Poole
Footballers from Dorset
English footballers
Association football goalkeepers
Poole Town F.C. players
AFC Bournemouth players
Dagenham & Redbridge F.C. players
Torquay United F.C. players
Gosport Borough F.C. players
Weymouth F.C. players
English Football League players
National League (English football) players
Southern Football League players